Nikita Olegovich Kiverin (born 25 March 1990) is a Russian professional football player. He plays for FC Novokuznetsk.

Club career
He played in the Russian Football National League for FC Irtysh Omsk in 2010.

External links
 
 

1990 births
Sportspeople from Omsk
Living people
Russian footballers
Association football midfielders
FC Irtysh Omsk players
FC Novokuznetsk players